Paphiopedilum sangii is a species of orchid endemic to northern Sulawesi.

sangii